The 2022 Dallas Wings season was the franchise's 25th season in the Women's National Basketball Association and the 7th season for the franchise in Dallas - after relocating from Tulsa and Detroit. This was second season under head coach Vickie Johnson.

The season got off to an up and down start with the Wings losing their first game, but winning the next two.  After losing the fourth game of the season, the team went on a three game winning streak.  However, they ended the month with two losses and finished May with a 5–4 record.  June started with their first five games being against Las Vegas or Seattle and the Wings went 1–4 in those games.  In their final six games of the month they went 3–3 to finish June 4–7.  Every loss in July was followed by a win, except for two straight losses to Chicago.  The Wings finished July 4–5, but solidly in playoff contention.  The team's fortunes changed in August when they won their first four games of the month and secured a spot in the 2022 WNBA Playoffs.  The Wings announced on August 12 that Arike Ogunbowale would miss the rest of the regular season and the 1st Round of the 2022 WNBA Playoffs after she underwent a iliac crest core muscle avulsion repair.  The Wings went 1–2 in regular season games Ogunbowale missed and the team finished August 5–2.  Their 18–18 record secured them the sixth seed in the playoffs.  The team's eighteen wins, was their most in a reglaur season as the Wings.  The last time the franchise won eighteen games in a season was in 2015, when they were known as the Tulsa Shock.

As the sixth seed, Dallas faced off against third seed Connecticut in the First Round of the playoffs.  Being the lower seed, Dallas would play the first two games of the three game series in Connecticut, with the third game being in Dallas if needed.  The Wings lost the first game by twenty five points in Connecticut, but would win the second game by ten to force a deciding game three in Dallas.  Home court did not prove advantageous, as the Wings lost game three by fifteen points.  Their 58 points in game three was their lowest point total of the season.

Transactions

WNBA Draft

Trades and Roster Changes

Roster

Depth

Schedule

Preseason

|- style="background:#cfc;"
| 1
| April 25
| @ Chicago
| W 92–77
| Marina Mabrey (24)
| Unique Thompson (10)
| BurtonHarris (5)
| Wintrust ArenaN/A
| 1–0

|- style="background:#cfc;"
| 2
| May 2
| Indiana
| W 101–89
| Isabelle Harrison (18)
| HarrisonKuier (8)
| Veronica Burton (6)
| College Park CenterN/A
| 2–0

Regular Season

|- style="background:#fcc;"
| 1
| May 7
| Atlanta
| L 59–66
| Marina Mabrey (20)
| Allisha Gray (9)
| GrayHarrisonBurton (2)
| College Park Center5,796
| 0–1
|- style="background:#cfc;"
| 2
| May 13
| @ Washington
| W 94–86
| Arike Ogunbowale (27)
| Isabelle Harrison (10)
| Tyasha Harris (10)
| Entertainment and Sports Arena3,281
| 1–1
|- style="background:#cfc;"
| 3
| May 15
| @ New York
| W 81–71
| Arike Ogunbowale (21)
| Isabelle Harrison (10)
| OgunbowaleThornton (4)
| Barclays Center3,095
| 2–1
|- style="background:#fcc;"
| 4
| May 17
| Washington
| L 68–84
| HarrisonMabrey (16)
| Kayla Thornton (8)
| Marina Mabrey (5)
| College Park Center3,035
| 2–2
|- style="background:#cfc;"
| 5
| May 19
| @ Phoenix
| W 94–84
| Arike Ogunbowale (37)
| Kayla Thornton (11)
| Marina Mabrey (10)
| Footprint Center6,151
| 3–2
|- style="background:#cfc;"
| 6
| May 21
| Minnesota
| W 94–78
| Marina Mabrey (22)
| MabreySaballyThornton (5)
| Arike Ogunbowale (7)
| College Park Center3,813
| 4–2
|- style="background:#cfc;"
| 7
| May 24
| @ Connecticut
| W 85–77
| Marina Mabrey (20)
| Kayla Thornton (10)
| Marina Mabrey (4)
| Mohegan Sun Arena4,180
| 5–2
|- style="background:#fcc;"
| 8
| May 26
| @ Connecticut
| L 68–99
| Satou Sabally (18)
| Isabelle Harrison (7)
| MabreyHarris (4)
| Mohegan Sun Arena4,308
| 5–3
|- style="background:#fcc;"
| 9
| May 31
| @ Los Angeles
| L 91–93
| Isabelle Harrison (20)
| Isabelle Harrison (8)
| Satou Sabally (4)
| Crypto.com Arena4,852
| 5–4
|-

|- style="background:#cfc;"
| 10
| June 3
| @ Seattle
| W 68–51
| Allisha Gray (18)
| Satou Sabally (11)
| Satou Sabally (6)
| Climate Pledge Arena8,023
| 6–4
|- style="background:#fcc;"
| 11
| June 5
| @ Las Vegas
| L 78–84
| Allisha Gray (24)
| Kayla Thornton (15)
| Tyasha Harris (5)
| Michelob Ultra Arena4,814
| 6–5
|- style="background:#fcc;"
| 12
| June 10
| Seattle
| L 88–89
| Arike Ogunbowale (23)
| HarrisonThornton (6)
| HarrisOgunbowale (6)
| College Park Center3,292
| 6–6
|- style="background:#fcc;"
| 13
| June 12
| Seattle
| L 79–84
| Allisha Gray (20)
| Kayla Thornton (14)
| Tyasha Harris (6)
| College Park Center3,273
| 6–7
|- style="background:#fcc;"
| 14
| June 15
| Las Vegas
| L 84–92
| Arike Ogunbowale (28)
| HarrisonThornton (10)
| Arike Ogunbowale (4)
| College Park Center4,375
| 6–8
|- style="background:#cfc;"
| 15
| June 17
| Phoenix
| W 93–88
| Arike Ogunbowale (24)
| Teaira McCowan (10)
| Arike Ogunbowale (6)
| College Park Center3,140
| 7–8
|- style="background:#cfc;"
| 16
| June 19
| Los Angeles
| W 92–82
| Arike Ogunbowale (27)
| Allisha Gray (12)
| Allisha Gray (6)
| College Park Center3,779
| 8–8
|- style="background:#fcc;"
| 17
| June 21
| @ Atlanta
| L 75–80
| Allisha Gray (18)
| Kayla Thornton (7)
| GrayMabrey (4)
| Gateway Center ArenaN/A
| 8–9
|- style="background:#cfc;"
| 18
| June 23
| Indiana
| W 94–68
| Arike Ogunbowale (24)
| Teaira McCowan (10)
| Arike Ogunbowale (6)
| College Park Center2,791
| 9–9
|- style="background:#fcc;"
| 19
| June 25
| Phoenix
| L 72–83
| Arike Ogunbowale (25)
| Isabelle Harrison (10)
| Arike Ogunbowale (6)
| College Park Center4,240
| 9–10
|- style="background:#fcc;"
| 20
| June 28
| @ Minnesota
| L 64–92
| Arike Ogunbowale (16)
| HarrisonMcCowan (8)
| Arike Ogunbowale (3)
| Target Center5,603
| 9–11
|-

|- style="background:#fcc;"
| 21
| July 1
| Los Angeles
| L 89–97
| Arike Ogunbowale (23)
| Teaira McCowan (10)
| Allisha Gray (4)
| College Park Center3,187
| 9–12
|- style="background:#cfc;"
| 22
| July 5
| Connecticut
| W 82–71
| Arike Ogunbowale (20)
| Allisha Gray (8)
| Marina Mabrey (5)
| College Park Center3,445
| 10–12
|- style="background:#fcc;"
| 23
| July 12
| @ Seattle
| L 74–83
| Teaira McCowan (18)
| Teaira McCowan (10)
| Marina Mabrey (5)
| Climate Pledge Arena9,486
| 10–13
|- style="background:#cfc;"
| 24
| July 14
| @ Minnesota
| W 92–87
| Arike Ogunbowale (32)
| Teaira McCowan (8)
| Tyasha Harris (6)
| Target Center4,834
| 11–13
|- style="background:#fcc;"
| 25
| July 16
| Chicago
| L 81–89
| Marina Mabrey (22)
| Teaira McCowan (6)
| Marina Mabrey (3)
| College Park Center5,126
| 11–14
|- style="background:#fcc;"
| 26
| July 22
| @ Chicago
| L 83–89
| Arike Ogunbowale (28)
| GrayMabrey (7)
| Tyasha Harris (6)
| Wintrust Arena7,014
| 11–15
|- style="background:#cfc;"
| 27
| July 24
| @ Indiana
| W 96–86
| Arike Ogunbowale (22)
| Kayla Thornton (8)
| OgunbowaleThornton (5)
| Hinkle Fieldhouse1,048
| 12–15
|- style="background:#fcc;"
| 28
| July 28
| Washington
| L 77–88
| Teaira McCowan (27)
| Teaira McCowan (11)
| Marina Mabrey (4)
| College Park Center4,382
| 12–16
|- style="background:#cfc;"
| 29
| July 30
| @ Atlanta
| W 81–68
| OgunbowaleThornton (21)
| Teaira McCowan (14)
| GrayOgunbowale (8)
| Gateway Center Arena3,138
| 13–16
|-

|- style="background:#cfc;"
| 30
| August 2
| @ Chicago
| W 84–78
| Marina Mabrey (26)
| Teaira McCowan (12)
| Veronica Burton (9)
| Wintrust Arena5,602
| 14–16
|- style="background:#cfc;"
| 31
| August 4
| Las Vegas
| W 82–80
| Teaira McCowan (21)
| Teaira McCowan (16)
| Tyasha Harris (6)
| College Park Center3,492
| 15–16
|- style="background:#cfc;"
| 32
| August 6
| Indiana
| W 95–91 (OT)
| Kayla Thornton (21)
| Teaira McCowan (14)
| Marina Mabrey (8)
| College Park Center4,184
| 16–16
|- style="background:#cfc;"
| 33
| August 8
| New York
| W 86–77
| Marina Mabrey (31)
| Teaira McCowan (9)
| GrayMabrey (4)
| College Park Center3,036
| 17–16
|- style="background:#fcc;"
| 34
| August 10
| New York
| L 73–91
| Marina Mabrey (19)
| Teaira McCowan (13)
| Marina Mabrey (6)
| College Park Center3,795
| 17–17
|- style="background:#fcc;"
| 35
| August 12
| @ Phoenix
| L 74–86
| Kayla Thornton (14)
| Teaira McCowan (9)
| Marina Mabrey (6)
| Footprint Center8,047
| 17–18
|- style="background:#cfc;"
| 36
| August 14
| @ Los Angeles
| W 116–88
| Marina Mabrey (27)
| Teaira McCowan (8)
| Tyasha Harris (11)
| Crypto.com Arena7,245
| 18–18
|-

Playoffs 

|- style="background:#fcc;"
| 1
| August 18
| @ Connecticut
| L 68–93
| Allisha Gray (17)
| GrayHarrisMcCowan (5)
| BurtonHarris (3)
| Mohegan Sun Arena4,797
| 0–1
|- style="background:#cfc;"
| 2
| August 21
| @ Connecticut
| W 89–79
| Kayla Thornton (20)
| Teaira McCowan (11)
| Allisha Gray (8)
| Mohegan Sun Arena6,788
| 1–1
|- style="background:#fcc;"
| 3
| August 24
| Connecticut
| L 58–73
| Marina Mabrey (20)
| Teaira McCowan (12)
| BurtonGray (4)
| College Park Center5,016
| 1–2

Standings

Playoffs

Statistics

Regular Season

‡Waived/Released during the season
†Traded during the season
≠Acquired during the season

Playoffs

Awards and Honors

References

External links 
 Official website of the Dallas Wings

Dallas Wings
Dallas Wings seasons
Dallas Wings